Katedralskolan (Swedish; Cathedral School in English; colloquially Katte; formerly Uppsala Högre Allmänna Läroverket, or Higher-level Public Education) is a public gymnasium in Uppsala, Sweden. The school was, according to tradition, established in 1246. It is the oldest educational institution in Uppsala, and one of the oldest in Sweden.

History 
A school administered by Uppsala Cathedral existed before the year 1300; originally, this school was a seminary for clergy and other church functionaries. In 1509, Gustav Eriksson, who would later become King Gustav I (also known as Gustavus Vasa), became a student at the school, according to Peder Svart's chronicle. Allegedly, he tired of his studies and left the school, having driven his dagger through a book and cursed his teacher.<ref>Norborg, Lars-Arne and Roland Henzel (eds.). 1955. Kungsord från Gustav Vasa till Gustav VI Adolf. Stockholm: Natur & Kultur. p 19.</ref>

From the late Middle Ages to the mid-19th century, education at the school focused on the three subjects that formed the trivium: grammar, dialectics and rhetoric. In 1865, the first student degrees were conferred on students at the school. By this time, the school was called Högre allmänna läroverket, a name it kept until 1972. In 1930, the first female students were accepted.

Until 1869, the school was located in various buildings next to the cathedral, but in that year, it moved to its current location. Several new buildings have been added to the original school building.

 Present day 
Today, Katedralskolan is a gymnasium with around 1200 students. Traditionally, Katedralskolan has focused on theoretical education in the humanities and natural sciences, but it also offers programmes in subjects such as child care.

The school offers the International Baccalaureate Diploma Programme, as well as advanced programmes in German, French, and Spanish.

There are a number of student societies, the oldest still existing one being the young scientists' society known as Matematisk-naturvetenskapliga föreningen (or MNF), founded in 1899.

 Gallery 

 Notable alumni 
 Gustav I (Gustav Vasa), King of Sweden 1523–1560
 Svante Arrhenius, 1903 Nobel laureate in Chemistry 
 Kai Siegbahn, 1981 Nobel laureate in Physics
 Dag Hammarskjöld, Secretary-General of the United Nations 1953–1961
 Magdalena Andersson, Prime Minister of Sweden 2021–2022
 Erik Gustaf Boström (1842–1907), Prime Minister of Sweden 1891–1900 and 1902–1905
 Hans Blix, former head of the International Atomic Energy Agency, Foreign Minister of Sweden 1978-1979
 Ebba Busch, leader of the Christian Democrats
 Åke Lindemalm, Swedish Navy admiral
 Hans Rosling, Swedish physician and academic, co-founder of the Gapminder Foundation
 Niklas Zennström, Swedish entrepreneur and billionaire 

 See also 
 List of oldest schools

 References 
Samuelsson, Sixten. 1952. Högre Allmänna Läroverket i Uppsala, En gammal skolas öden från 1200-talet till våra dagar''. Uppsala: AB Lundequistiska Bokhandeln.

External links 
  

Gymnasiums (school) in Sweden
International Baccalaureate schools in Sweden
Buildings and structures in Uppsala
Educational institutions established in the 13th century
13th-century establishments in Sweden
Education in Uppsala